, nicknamed , is a Japanese singer and dancer. She is known as one of the members of the Japanese electropop group Perfume.

Biography
Nishiwaki was born and raised in Hiroshima, Japan, where she attended Actor's School Hiroshima with friends and current Perfume members Yuka Kashino and Ayano Ōmoto.

She formed Perfume in 2000 with Kashino and former member Yūka Kawashima, who left shortly after to focus on her schoolwork. After discussing the issue with her mother, who believed that a three-piece group had more stage presence than a duo, Nishiwaki asked Ōmoto to join the group.

Her younger sister Sayaka is a member of the group "9nine".

In March 2011, Nishiwaki graduated from Asia University with a degree in economics.

Solo works

On 18 April 2008 Perfume made a special guest appearance performing "Ceramic Girl" at the ending of the drama "Sumire ♡ 16 sai!!".

On 23 March 2012 Perfume made a special guest appearance performing "Baby Cruising Love" in the movie "Moteki".

In 2014 Nishiwaki, along with Haruichi Shindo, co-wrote the song , theme of the Amuse Fes 2014 BB in Tsumagoi event, performed by 13 artists: Perfume, Porno Graffitti, Flumpool, Begin, Skoop On Somebody, Yu Takahashi, Weaver, Mihiro, Monobright, Rihwa, Haku, Sakura Fujiwara & Cross Gene.

In April 2014 and March 2016, Nishiwaki presented the radio program  at JFN Shikoku 4 stations.

On 20 June 2016 debuted , a radio program hosted by the Nishiwaki sisters on JFN PARK.

On 18 January 2017, A-chan played the voice of an imaginative creature "Liva" (red) in NTV drama 'Tokyo Tarareba Girls'.

On 31 March and 1 April 2017, A~chan played the character "Don-chan" on the TV Tokyo Special drama 'Pensées'.

In September 2017, A-chan dubbed "the rescue squad" on "FASTENING DAYS 3" mini-series.

In January 2020, A-chan starts serving as a studio MC of "I want to fall in love with a romantic drama ~Bang Ban Love~" on AbemaSPECIAL! The first episode starts at 11:00 p.m. on 25 Jan.

In September 2020, A-chan continues serving as a studio MC of "I want to love the drama of love ～Kiss On The Bed～" on AbemaSPECIAL! The first episode starts at 11:00 p.m. on 26 Sep.

In October 2020, A-chan returns to dubb Reba in the Special Drama 'Tokyo Tarareba Girls 2020'

In May 2021, A-chan continues serving as a studio MC of "I want to fall in love with a romantic drama ~KISS or Kiss~" on AbemaSPECIAL! The first episode starts at 11:00 p.m. on 1 May.

In October 2021, A-chan continues serving as a studio MC of "I want to fall in love with a romantic drama ~Kissing the Tears Away~" on AbemaSPECIAL! The first episode starts at 10:00 p.m. on 31 Oct.

In May 2022, A-chan continues serving as a studio MC of "I want to fall in love with a romantic drama ~Kiss me like a princess~" on AbemaSPECIAL! The first episode starts at 10:00 p.m. on 15 May.

In November 2022, A-chan continues serving as a studio MC of "I want to fall in love with a romantic drama in NEW YORK" on AbemaSPECIAL! The first episode starts at 10:00 p.m. on 13 Nov.

References

External links 

  
 
 

Japanese women pop singers
Japanese female dancers
Perfume (Japanese band) members
1989 births
Living people
Musicians from Hiroshima